The Belgian Fourth Division B was one of the four leagues at the fourth level of the Belgian football league system, the other ones being the Belgian Fourth Division A, C and D.  This division existed from the 1952–53 to 2015–16 seasons and was played every year with 16 clubs in each league. The league was replaced by Belgian Second Amateur Division.

The final clubs

 — RWDM's number 5479 was previously held by K. Standaard Wetteren which merged with R.R.C. Wetteren to become R.F.C. Wetteren.
 — R. Charleroi CF won the second round of the Belgian interprovincial play-off 
 — K.S.K. Halle won the Brabant Division One play-off

See also
Belgian Third Division
Belgian Fourth Division
Belgian Provincial leagues
Belgian football league system

References

B